Graham Marshall may refer to:

Graham Marshall (rugby union) (born 1960), Scottish international rugby union player
Graham Marshall (footballer), New Zealand footballer